Peter Riva (born May 11, 1950) is an American literary agent and producer. He managed Voyager's "Round the World Flight Program" in 1985. He also produced the United Nations' event "Only One Earth" (1990), for which he won a Telly Award.

Early life
John Peter Riva was born on May 11, 1950, in Manhattan to William Riva, a Broadway and TV set designer, and Maria Riva, the only child of Marlene Dietrich, who was an early TV star (for William S. Paley, CBS) and Broadway actress. His older brother J. Michael Riva, a production designer, died in 2012 and he has two younger brothers, John Paul and John David.

Riva attended the prep school Institut Le Rosey for 5 years, and then attended first Carnegie-Mellon University and UCLA Film School. He afterwards was part of the BBC apprentice program where he was a gofer for Ian MacNaughton, producer of the series Monty Python's Flying Circus.

Career
Riva is the co-founder of International Transactions, Inc., a literary agency. Riva has worked as a literary agent with his wife Sandra Anne since 1972. He has represented authors like Stieg Larsson (Girl with the Dragon Tattoo trilogy), Maria Riva (Dietrich by Her Daughter), Peter Beard, Ake Edwardson, Pieter Aspe, John Enright, Dick Rutan and Jeana Yeager.

From the early 1970s to the early 1980s he licensed toys and games for companies including Columbia Pictures, Paramount Pictures, and Witt-Thomas-Harris.

Riva has produced over ten television documentaries, including the ABC With Peter Beard in Africa (1988) and BBC/PBS "The Voyager Story" (1987). He was a co-producer on White Mountain Film's "In the Blood" (Africa, 1987).

He produced the United Nations' Headquarter (NY) event "Only One Earth" (1990), broadcast to 1.1 billion people worldwide (for which Riva won a "Telly Award"). The footage showed negotiations for the first global environmental treaty between the US and USSR.

He produced two expeditions: The Rio Roosevelt Expedition (Amazon, 1992) and the Livingston Expedition (Africa, 1995). In 1995, along with his partner Bertram van Munster, he created and produced the television series (Paramount Television) Wild Things, 78 one-hour reality TV episodes. He was co-executive producer on a number of projects including Jim Kohlberg's Home in the Morning based on the book by Mary Glickman.

In the 1980s Riva produced over a dozen art exhibits. He produced "Sightseeing, A Panorama From Space," an art photographic exhibit which has become the world's most attended art exhibit. The project was conceived in 1982 with the help of Ansel Adams, Lucien Clergue and Senator Edward Kennedy. It came to include over 175,000 hand-held astronaut images never before seen (1984). The exhibit opened at the National Air and Space Museum (1985, Washington, D.C.) and at the Rencontres Internationales de la Photographie (1985, Arles, France).

In 1984 he was asked to advise, and in 1985 took over as de facto project manager, for the Voyager 'Round the World Flight program. The Voyager completed the 1st nonstop circumnavigation of the globe on December 14, 1986. In 1986 Riva arranged for the Voyager aircraft to be permanently displayed in the National Air & Space Museum.

In 1993 he arranged for the Marlene Dietrich Collection to be displayed permanently in Berlin at the Deutsche Kinemathek. The museum constructed a new building for that display at the Sony Center on the Potsdam Platz, Berlin. He is manager of the Marlene Dietrich companies, including the Marlene Dietrich Foundation (Munich, Germany), and also manages her legacy.

He is on the board of the FilmMuseum Berlin (part of the Deutsche Kinemathek, Berlin), advised the UN Environment Programme for 15 years and the Rencontres Internationales de la Photographie (Arles, France) for 8 years. He was also on the board of New Century Conservation Trust and the Global Communications for Conservation charity.

Personal life
Riva and his wife, Sandra Anne, met in Spain when they were 13 and married at the age of 22 in London, England. They have two sons, John Matthew (born 1976) and Sean Peter (born 1979), both born in London.

Awards
 Honorary Citizen of Arles, France, 1985
 Teddy Award, National Outdoor Travel Film Festival, 1988
 Telly Award, 1991

References

External links
 
 Peter Riva at Publishers Marketplace
 Peter Riva at Scribd

American expatriates in Switzerland
American expatriates in the United Kingdom
American people of German descent
Living people
1950 births
UCLA Film School alumni
Alumni of Institut Le Rosey